Government Zamindar College, Gujrat is a government college located in the Gujrat District of Punjab, Pakistan. The college also offers postgraduate courses.

History
It was founded as Cold Stream Zamindar School by Nawab Sir Fazal Ali. In 1938, it was upgraded into a college.

Alumni
Tilak Raj Puri, Indian bureaucrat and statistician
Anwar Masood, Pakistani poet
Ismat Beg, scholar, researcher and teacher
Manzoor Hussain Atif, Pakistani Olympian
Khalil-ur-Rehman Khan, Chief Justice of the Lahore High Court
Raja Afrasiab Khan, Judge of the Supreme Court of Pakistan
Hamid Rehman, consultant in Pulmonary Medicine at the Mayo Clinic, Rochester, MN, USA
Fakhar Zaman
Malik Allahyar Khan

References

Universities and colleges in Gujrat District
Schools in Punjab, Pakistan
1930s establishments in British India